Nitidella nitida, common name: the glossy dove shell, is a species of sea snail, a marine gastropod mollusk in the family Columbellidae, the dove snails.

Description
The shell size varies between 9 mm and 16 mm.

Distribution
This species is distributed in the Red Sea and in the Gulf of Mexico, the Caribbean Sea and the Lesser Antilles, and from Florida to Brazil.

References

 Vine, P. (1986). Red Sea Invertebrates. Immel Publishing, London. 224 pp.
 Rosenberg, G., F. Moretzsohn, and E. F. García. 2009. Gastropoda (Mollusca) of the Gulf of Mexico, pp. 579–699 in Felder, D.L. and D.K. Camp (eds.), Gulf of Mexico–Origins, Waters, and Biota. Biodiversity. Texas A&M Press, College Station, Texas

External links
 

Columbellidae
Gastropods described in 1822